Peter Arrell Browne Widener (November 13, 1834 – November 6, 1915) was an American businessman, art collector, and patriarch of the Widener family of Philadelphia, Pennsylvania.

Widener was ranked #29 on the American Heritage list of the forty richest Americans in history, with a net worth at death of $23 billion to $25 billion (in 1998 dollars).

Early life
The son of a Philadelphia butcher, Widener was born on November 13, 1834, to Johannes Widener and Sarah Fulmer. He was named after Peter Arrell Browne (1782–1860), a noted lawyer in 19th-century Philadelphia.

Career
During the Civil War, Widener won a contract to supply mutton to all Union Army troops within 10 miles of Philadelphia. The city was a major transportation hub for troop deployment, and the location of many of the largest Union military hospitals. Widener invested his $50,000 profit in horse-drawn city streetcar lines. He grew to prominence in Philadelphia politics, and had become the City Treasurer by 1871. In 1883, he was a founding partner in the Philadelphia Traction Company, which electrified the city's trolley lines, and expanded into other major cities in the United States.

He and his business partner, William L. Elkins, invested with businessmen such as Charles Tyson Yerkes, the streetcar czar of Chicago. Widener used the great wealth accumulated from public transportation to become a founding organizer of U.S. Steel and the American Tobacco Company, as well as to acquire substantial holdings in Standard Oil and International Mercantile Marine Company. He is considered to have been among the 100 wealthiest Americans, having left an enormous fortune.

He died on November 6, 1915, in Elkins Park, Pennsylvania and was interred at Laurel Hill Cemetery in Philadelphia.

Personal life
In 1858, he married Hannah Josephine Dunton (1836–1896), and they had three sons. His first son Harry (1859-1874) died young, from typhoid fever.  His son George Dunton Widener (1861–1912) died aboard the RMS Titanic. His youngest son Joseph Early Widener (1871–1943) was a noted art collector. His grandson, George D. Widener Jr. (1889-1971), a noted horse racing figure, was also the chairman of the Philadelphia Museum of Art.

P.A B. Widener died at Lynnewood Hall at the age of 80 on November 6, 1915, having suffered from poor health for three years. After his death, his estate was valued at $31,589,353. By 1945, the accumulated income plus the current value of the real and personal property totaled $98,368,058.

Residences
In 1887, Widener built an ornate mansion (designed by Willis G. Hale) in Philadelphia, at the northwest corner of Broad Street and Girard Avenue. He vacated it 13 years later and donated it (as a memorial for his late wife) to the Free Library of Philadelphia, which used it as a branch library from 1900 to 1946. The building burned in 1980, and it was demolished.

In 1900, he completed Lynnewood Hall in Elkins Park, Pennsylvania, a 110-room Georgian-style mansion designed by Horace Trumbauer. Widener was an avid art collector, with a collection that included more than a dozen paintings by Rembrandt, as well as works by then-new artists Édouard Manet and Auguste Renoir.

Art collection
Widener amassed a significant art collection that included works by Old Masters such as Vermeer, Rembrandt, Raphael and El Greco, British 18th- and 19th-century paintings, and works by French Impressionist artists such as Corot, Renoir, Degas and Manet.

About 1905, he purchased the crucifixion panel from Rogier van der Weyden's Crucifixion Diptych (1460) in Paris. The following year he sold it to John G. Johnson, who reunited the two halves and later donated them to the Philadelphia Museum of Art.

Widener's son Joseph donated more than 300 works—including paintings, sculpture, metalwork, stained glass, furniture, rugs, Chinese porcelains, and majolica—to the National Gallery of Art in 1942.

Note: The artworks below are in the collection of the National Gallery of Art, unless otherwise listed.

Old Masters

British paintings

French Impressionism

20th century

Decorative arts

See also 
 Rhône (The) v. Peter A.B. Widener (The) (a barge named after Widener was involved in a collision in Canada, which became a noted court case)
 Widener University

References

External links
 Article on Widener and Widener Mansion in Philadelphia, PhillyHistory.org.

1834 births
1915 deaths
American transportation businesspeople
American art collectors
Widener family
Businesspeople from Pennsylvania
People from Cheltenham, Pennsylvania
19th-century American businesspeople
Burials at Laurel Hill Cemetery (Philadelphia)